Helmuth Vetter (21 March 1910 in Rastenberg – 2 February 1949) was an SS-Hauptsturmführer and a Nazi war criminal.

Vetter was a doctor at the Auschwitz extermination camp, appointed chief doctor by Reichsführer-SS Heinrich Himmler. He joined other doctors (such as Hans König, Heinz Thilo, and Fritz Klein) in the task of choosing employable Jews to operate the industrial machines and sending others to the gas chambers. He also carried medical experiments on prisoners, involving phenol injections
 As paid retainer of IG Farben, Vetter would also deliberately infect prisoners in Auschwitz, Dachau and Gusen to carry out medical experiments.  After the war, Vetter was found guilty of war crimes and sentenced to death. He was hanged in the prison of Landsberg am Lech.

References

External links 
 "Medical Experiments at KZ Guzen", Jewish Virtual Library

1910 births
1949 deaths
Holocaust perpetrators in Austria
Holocaust perpetrators in Poland
People from Sömmerda (district)
People from Saxe-Weimar-Eisenach
Nazi Party members
Physicians in the Nazi Party
SS-Hauptsturmführer
Auschwitz concentration camp medical personnel
Mauthausen concentration camp personnel
Dachau trials executions
Executed people from Thuringia
Executed mass murderers